Rockvale Township is located in Ogle County, Illinois. As of the 2010 census, its population was 1,770 and it contained 804 housing units.

History
Rockvale Township was originally named Brooklyn Township, but changed its name on November 12, 1850.

Geography

Demographics

References

External links 
City-data.com
Ogle County Official Site
Illinois State Archives

Townships in Ogle County, Illinois
Populated places established in 1849
Townships in Illinois
1849 establishments in Illinois